Birger "Bigge" Jacobsson (born 17 October 1949) is a former Swedish footballer and football coach. He made 150 Allsvenskan appearances for Djurgårdens IF and scored two goals.

In 2013, he was assistant coach to Pia Sundhage in the Sweden women's national football team.

References

Swedish footballers
Allsvenskan players
Djurgårdens IF Fotboll players
1949 births
Living people
Association football defenders